Jamie Roche; born 5 April 2001) is a Swedish football midfielder who plays for IK Sirius.

References

2001 births
Living people
Swedish footballers
Association football midfielders
IK Sirius Fotboll players
Allsvenskan players